The Last Temptation of Chris is an album by Chris Difford, one of the founding members of the new wave band Squeeze. It was released on 7 April 2008. This is his second solo album, a follow-up to I Didn't Get Where I Am in 2002. It is dedicated to Difford's brother, Les, who died before its release. The title is a play on The Last Temptation of Christ. The cover shows Difford slouched at a counter with a cup of coffee and wearing a black Homburg hat and a black Astrakhan coat, in homage to the comedian Tony Hancock as depicted in a photograph.

Track listing
 "Come on Down" – 3:32
 "Broken Family" – 3:04
 "Battersea Boys" – 4:06
 "On My Own I'm Never Bored" – 4:06
 "Julian and Sandy" – 3:37
 "The Other Man in my Life" – 3:53
 "My Mother's Handbag" – 3:47
 "Fat as a Fiddle" – 3:25
 "The Gates of Eden" – 3:56
 "Reverso" – 5:38
 "Never Coming Back" – 3:32
 "Good Life" – 3:09
 "The Party's Over" – 3:48

Personnel
Chris Difford – vocals, guitar
Melvin Duffy – guitar, lap steel, pedal steel, weissenborn, banjo
Boo Hewerdine – guitar, backing vocals, piano
Dorie Jackson – backing vocals
Simon Little – bass guitar
Pete Long – clarinet
Neil MacColl – guitar
David Marks – bass guitar
John Parricelli – guitar
Mark Taylor – piano, organ
Enrico Tomasso – trumpet, brass
Jim Watson – piano
Tim Weller – drums

Other credits
All songs written by Chris Difford and Boo Hewerdine, except "Battersea Boys" and "The Party’s Over" written by Chris Difford and Geoff Martyn
Produced by Boo Hewerdine, Chris Difford and John Wood
Engineered by John Wood and Ian Davenport 
Cover phototograph: Roy Burimston 
Mastered by Tim Young

References

2008 albums